In enzymology, a hexadecanol dehydrogenase is an enzyme that catalyzes the chemical reaction

hexadecanol + NAD+  hexadecanal + NADH + H+

Thus, the two substrates of this enzyme are hexadecanol and NAD+, whereas its 3 products are hexadecanal, NADH, and H+.

This enzyme belongs to the family of oxidoreductases, specifically those acting on the CH-OH group of donor with NAD+ or NADP+ as acceptor. The systematic name of this enzyme class is hexadecanol:NAD+ oxidoreductase.

References

 
 

EC 1.1.1
NADH-dependent enzymes
Enzymes of unknown structure